Earl D. Tanner (born February 20, 1950) is an American politician and a former Republican member of the Utah House of Representatives. He represented District 43 from January 2013 through January 2017.

Early life and education
Tanner was born and raised in the Salt Lake Valley, the oldest of the six children of Earl D. Tanner and Mary Louise Lyon. He graduated from Skyline High School in 1968, then got a degree in mathematics from the University of Utah in 1971. Tanner served an LDS mission in the Philippines before entering law school at the University of Utah. He began practicing law with his father in 1976. He served in the Utah National Guard as a member of the 19th Special Forces Group.

He moved to West Jordan in 1978.

Political career
Tanner was first elected on November 6, 2012. During the 2016 legislative session, he served on the House Law Enforcement and Criminal Justice Committee and the House Public Utilities and Technology Committee.

2016 sponsored legislation

Tanner did not floor sponsor any legislation during 2016.

Elections
2012 When incumbent Republican Representative Wayne Harper ran for Utah State Senate, Tanner was chosen from among three candidates at the Republican convention and won the November 6, 2012 general election with 7,113 votes (60.1%) against Democratic nominee Jeff Bell.
2014 Tanner was unopposed for the 2012 Republican convention and won the November 4, 2014 general election with 3,968 votes (57.5%) against Democratic nominee Diane Lewis.

References

External links
Official page at the Utah State Legislature
Campaign site

Earl Tanner at Ballotpedia
Earl Tanner at OpenSecrets
Bills sponsored by Rep. Tanner during the 2014 General Session

Living people
Republican Party members of the Utah House of Representatives
Politicians from Salt Lake City
People from West Jordan, Utah
University of Utah alumni
Utah lawyers
S.J. Quinney College of Law alumni
American Mormon missionaries in the Philippines
20th-century Mormon missionaries
Latter Day Saints from Utah
1950 births
21st-century American politicians